John M. Geddes is an American journalist who served as one of two managing editors of The New York Times. He was appointed to that post in 2003, and left it in 2013. Geddes served as managing editor for news operations. He and Jill Abramson were selected to replace former managing editor Gerald M. Boyd, who resigned after copyright infringements by Jayson Blair were found.

Background
Geddes attended college at the University of Rhode Island, graduating in 1974 with a degree in economics, and obtained a master's degree in business journalism in 1976 from the University of Wisconsin–Madison. He currently serves as an Executive Advisory Board member for the Harrington School of Communication and Media at the University of Rhode Island.

During the late 1970s to early 1990s, Geddes primarily worked at The Wall Street Journal in editorial positions. He also was hired by both the Ansonia Evening Sentinel and the A.P.-Dow Jones News Service as a reporter. Geddes was a marketing research executive before becoming part of the staff for The New York Times in 1994. He started out as a business editor for becoming deputy managing editor in 1997. On January 18, 2013, Geddes announced he was accepting a buyout offer and would be leaving the Times.

Notes

Year of birth missing (living people)
Living people
The New York Times masthead editors
American male journalists
University of Rhode Island alumni
University of Wisconsin–Madison School of Journalism & Mass Communication alumni